On a sailing vessel, a forestay, sometimes just called a stay, is a piece of standing rigging which keeps a mast from falling backwards.  It is attached either at the very top of the mast, or in fractional rigs between about 1/8 and 1/4 from the top of the mast.  The other end of the forestay is attached to the bow of the boat.

Often a sail is attached to the forestay.  This sail may be a jib or a genoa.  In a cutter rig, the jib or jibs are flown from stays in front of the forestay, perhaps going from the masthead to a bowsprit.  The sail on the forestay is then referred to as the staysail or stays'l.

A forestay might be made from stainless steel wire on a modern yacht, solid stainless steel rod, carbon rod, or ultra high molecular weight polyethylene (such as Spectra or Dyneema)  on a high-performance racing boat, and galvanised wire or natural fibers on an older cutter or square-rigged ship.

See also
 Backstay  
 Shroud (sailing)

References

External links
 

Nautical terminology
Sailing rigs and rigging